Ronald George Guthrie (born 19 April 1944 in Burradon, Northumberland) is an English former professional footballer. After signing for Newcastle United in 1963, he played 56 league matches, scoring 2 goals, before joining Sunderland on 15 January 1973. A defender, he played at left back for Sunderland in the 1973 FA Cup Final winning team. He left Sunderland, joining Ashington, in 1975 after three seasons.

Later joining near rivals Blyth Spartans Guthrie was part of the famous 'giant killing' team that reached the 5th round of the FA Cup in 1978 losing to Wrexham in a replay at St James Park watched by over 42,000 with thousands locked outside, but not after drawing a potential home tie against Arsenal in the quarter finals.

His first goal for Sunderland came in the 1972–73 FA Cup in a 2–0 victory over Luton Town.

Career statistics

References

External links
 Ron Guthrie statistics from statcats.com
 Player Profile: Ronald George Guthrie at toon1892.co.uk

English footballers
Newcastle United F.C. players
Sunderland A.F.C. players
Living people
1944 births
Association football fullbacks
FA Cup Final players